James Hampton Duncan (May 2, 1924 – January 5, 2011) was an American gridiron football player and coach.

After playing for the Duke Blue Devils under Wallace Wade in 1946, Duncan spent three seasons as a standout defensive lineman for Peahead Walker's Wake Forest Demon Deacons. He was an All-Southern Conference player all three years at Wake Forest and was the team MVP in 1949.

Duncan was a linebacker and defensive end for the New York Giants of the National Football League (NFL) from 1950 to 1955. He was drafted by the Chicago Bears in both the 1948 and 1949 NFL drafts while also being drafted by the Cleveland Browns in the ninth round of the 1950 NFL Draft. He was named Giants co-captain, along with Kyle Rote in 1954. He missed the entire season due to an injury and was cut by the team the following season.

Duncan was the 13th head football coach at Appalachian State Teachers College—now known as Appalachian State University—located in the town of Boone, North Carolina, serving from 1960 to 1964. He had a 31–15–2 as the Mountaineers head coach. On December 4, 1964, Duncan resigned as head football coach at Appalachian State.

In 1965, Duncan joined the Saskatchewan Roughriders of the Canadian Football League (CFL) as an assistant under head coach Eagle Keys. He was with the team when they defeated the Ottawa Rough Riders in the 54th Grey Cup and when the team lost to the Hamilton Tiger-Cats in the 55th Grey Cup.

Duncan became head coach of the Calgary Stampeders in 1969, replacing Jerry Williams who left the team to join the Philadelphia Eagles. Duncan's stint with the Stamps resulted in two Grey Cup appearances; one win (59th) and one loss (58th). Duncan was fired in 1973 after back to back 6–10 seasons. His overall record with Calgary was 39–40–1.

After his dismissal, Duncan was hired by a group from London, Ontario, who hoped to bring professional football to their city, and was later hired as executive assistant of the Portland Storm of the World Football League (WFL).

Duncan died from complications of Alzheimer's disease in 2011 at the age of 86.

Head coaching record

College

CFL

References

External links
 

1924 births
2011 deaths
American football defensive ends
Appalachian State Mountaineers football coaches
Calgary Stampeders coaches
Duke Blue Devils football players
New York Giants players
Saskatchewan Roughriders coaches
Wake Forest Demon Deacons football players
People from Reidsville, North Carolina
Players of American football from North Carolina
Deaths from Alzheimer's disease
Deaths from dementia in North Carolina